Dirk Hannemann (born 11 August 1970) is a German former professional footballer who played as a midfielder. He made 11 appearances in the Austrian Bundesliga and 12 appearances in the 2. Bundesliga during his playing career.

References

External links 
 

1970 births
Living people
People from Dessau-Roßlau
People from Bezirk Halle
German footballers
Footballers from Saxony-Anhalt
Association football midfielders
Austrian Football Bundesliga players
2. Bundesliga players
Hallescher FC players
MSV Duisburg players
FC Hansa Rostock players
SV Ried players
Tennis Borussia Berlin players
1. FC Magdeburg players
1. FC Lokomotive Leipzig players
German football managers
German expatriate footballers
German expatriate sportspeople in Austria
Expatriate footballers in Austria